Stan Castles (28 June 1906 – 8 March 1987) was an  Australian rules footballer who played with Fitzroy in the Victorian Football League (VFL).

Notes

External links 

1906 births
1987 deaths
Australian rules footballers from New South Wales
Fitzroy Football Club players